Tex Williamson (born 1 January 1991) is a professional Swedish ice hockey player. He was born in Lammhult, Sweden. Tex currently plays for Modo Hockey in the HockeyAllsvenskan (Allsv). He formerly played with IK Oskarshamn in the Swedish Hockey League (SHL). His youth team was Alvesta SK.

References

External links

1991 births
Living people
IK Oskarshamn players
IK Pantern players
Leksands IF players
Modo Hockey players
Swedish ice hockey goaltenders
Tingsryds AIF players
People from Växjö Municipality
Sportspeople from Kronoberg County